John Alexander Greer (July 18, 1802 – July 4, 1855) was a Texan politician, and the second Lieutenant Governor of Texas serving under Governors George T. Wood and Peter H. Bell.

Greer was born at Shelbyville, Tennessee on July 18, 1802. He was in Kentucky before moving to Texas in 1830. He represented San Augustine as a senator in the Congress of the Republic of Texas from 1837–1845. Anson Jones, the last president of the Republic of Texas, appointed him as secretary of the treasury in July 1845. He was the Lieutenant Governor of Texas from 1847–1851. He died on July 4, 1855.

John A. Greer is the namesake of Greer County, Oklahoma.

References

1802 births
1855 deaths
People from Shelbyville, Tennessee
Lieutenant Governors of Texas
Republic of Texas Senators
Texas Democrats
19th-century American politicians
People from San Augustine, Texas